In chemistry, a dehydration reaction is a chemical reaction that involves the loss of water from the reacting molecule or ion. Dehydration reactions are common processes, the reverse of a hydration reaction.

Dehydration reactions in organic chemistry

Esterification
The classic example of a dehydration reaction is the Fischer esterification, which involves treating a carboxylic acid with an alcohol to give an ester
RCO2H + R′OH  RCO2R′ + H2O
Often such reactions require the presence of a dehydrating agent, i.e. a substance that reacts with water.

Etherification
Two monosaccharides, such as glucose and fructose, can be joined together (to form saccharose) using dehydration synthesis. The new molecule, consisting of two monosaccharides, is called a disaccharide.

Nitrile formation
Nitriles are often prepared by dehydration of primary amides.
RC(O)NH2  →   RCN  + H2O

Ketene formation
Ketene is produced by heating acetic acid and trapping the product:
CH3CO2H  →   CH2=C=O  + H2O

Alkene formation
Alkenes can be made from alcohols by dehydration.  This conversion, among others, is a key reaction in converting biomass to liquid fuels.  The conversion of ethanol to ethene is a fundamental example:
   CH3CH2OH → H2C=CH2 + H2O
The reaction is slow in the absence of acid catalysts such as sulfuric acid and certain zeolites.

Some alcohols are prone to dehydration.  3-Hydroxylcarbonyls, called aldols, release water upon standing at room temperature:
RC(O)CH2CH(OH)R'  →  RC(O)CH=CHR'  +  H2O

In the dienol benzene rearrangement, dehydration leads to aromatization.

Often the reaction is induced by dehydrating reagents.  For example, 2-methyl-cyclohexan-1-ol dehydrates to 1-methylcyclohexene in the presence of Martin's sulfurane, which reacts irreversibly with water.<ref>{{cite journal | title = Dehydration of 2-Methyl-1-cyclohexanol: New Findings from a Popular Undergraduate Laboratory Experiment | author1 = J. Brent Friesen | author2 = Robert Schretzman | journal = J. Chem. Educ. | year = 2011 | volume = 88 | issue = 8 | pages = 1141–1147 | doi = 10.1021/ed900049b| bibcode = 2011JChEd..88.1141F }}</ref>

Double dehydration is illustrated by the conversion of glycerol to acrolein:

Dehydration reactions in inorganic chemistry
The formation of the pyrophosphate bond is an important dehydration relevant to bioenergetics.

Various construction materials are produced by dehydration. Plaster of Paris is produced by dehydration of gypsum in a kiln:
CaSO4.2H2O +{} heat -> CaSO4.1/2H2O + 1 1/2H2O (released as steam).''

The resulting dry powder is ready to be mixed with water to form a stiff but workable paste that hardens.

See also
Hydration reaction
Condensation reaction
Hydrolysis

References

Elimination reactions